Michael Alfred Baughen (born 7 June 1930) is a retired Anglican bishop.

Born in Borehamwood, Hertfordshire, he was educated at Bromley County Grammar School, the University of London and Oak Hill Theological College.

After ordination, he served as Rector of Holy Trinity Church in Platt Lane, Rusholme, Manchester and All Souls, Langham Place in London. He served as the 39th Bishop of Chester between 1982 and 1996. Following his retirement, he worked as an honorary assistant bishop in the Diocese of London and in the Diocese of Southwark.

Baughen is also noted for his contribution to hymnody.  He is particularly known for his tune "Lord of the Years" for Timothy Dudley-Smith's hymn "Lord for the Years".  He is also well known as editor of and writer and composer for Youth Praise  (Book 1, 1964, and Book 2, 1969) and Psalm Praise (1973), and for Hymns for Today's Church (Jubilate Hymns, 1982), for which he was consultant editor and contributor, and as Editorial Chairman of Sing Glory (2000).

References

External links
Profile at Jubilate Group
Profile at Church of Ireland
Works on Hymnary.org

1930 births
Living people
People from Borehamwood
Alumni of the University of London
Alumni of Oak Hill College
Bishops of Chester
Church of England hymnwriters
20th-century Church of England bishops